{{Infobox person
| name          = William Eldon Warwick
| image         = 
| alt           = 
| caption       = 
| birth_name    = 
| birth_date    = 
| birth_place   = Birkenhead, UK
| death_date    = 
| death_place   = 
| nationality   = British
| other_names   = 
| occupation    = Master Mariner
| years_active  =
| known_for     = First Master of the Queen Elizabeth 2 (QE2)
| children      =Eldon J WARWICK, Ronald W Warwick and David B Warwick.
| notable_works =
}} 
Captain William "Bil" Warwick, CBE was a merchant sailor and the Master of Cunard's Queen Elizabeth 2 (QE2), the first person to hold that position did so for over 25 years.

He was born on 12 November 1912 in Birkenhead, England.

He appeared as a castaway on the BBC Radio programme Desert Island Discs'' on 18 September 1967.

He was made a Commander of the Order of the British Empire (CBE) in 1971.

He died on 27 February 1999. His son, Captain Ronald W Warwick, was a master of the Queen Elizabeth 2 during the time of his death, Ronald W Warwick was Captain of the QE2 for 13 years this was the first time a Father and Son had made it to the rank of captain of the Cunard and the first time a Father and Son had been in command of the same ship as Captain BIL WARWICK was QE2’s first Master, Both Captains would become Cunard Commodores as Commmodor RON WARWICK would become the first Master of the Queen Mary 2 the largest Ocean liner in the world.                                                                                           

Eldon  J Warwick would become the Royal Naval Reserve and was the Commodore of the Cunard Line.

References 
He had three sons all of whom spent sometime at sea.

1912 births
Place of birth missing
1999 deaths
Place of death missing
Commanders of the Order of the British Empire
Ship captains of the Cunard Line
People from Birkenhead
British Merchant Navy officers